Konstantinovka may refer to:
İsmətli or Konstantinovka, a place in Azerbaijan
Kostiantynivka or Konstantinovka, a city in Donetsk Oblast, Ukraine
Konstantinovka, Russia, a list of rural localities in Russia

pl:Konstantynówka
ru:Константиновка